Trachelyichthys exilis is a species of driftwood catfish endemic to Peru where it is found in the Nanay River basin.  It grows to a length of 8.0 cm.

References 
 

Auchenipteridae
Fish of South America
Freshwater fish of Peru
Fish described in 1977